Chibuzor is a given name. Notable people with the name include:

Chibuzor Chilaka (born 1986), Nigerian footballer
Chibuzor Nwogbo (born 1990), Nigerian footballer
Chibuzor Okonkwo (born 1988), Nigerian footballer 

African given names